Altounyan, Altunyan, Altounian, and Altonian (Armenian: Ալթունյան; Western Armenian: Ալթունեան) is a common Armenian surname. It can refer to:

Altounyan
Roger Altounyan (1922–1987), Anglo-Armenian physician and pharmacologist

Altunyan
Ruben Altunyan (1939–2021), Armenian composer
Tatul Altunyan (1901–1973), Armenian conductor

Altounian
David Altounian, entrepreneur and businessman
Essaï Altounian (born 1980), French-Armenian singer, songwriter, keyboardist, music producer and an actor
Joe Altounian, American-Armenian entrepreneur and businessman
Levon Altounian (1936–2020), Lebanese-Armenian footballer

See also
Altun

Armenian-language surnames